Sookval Samaroo (1912 – 5 December 1987) was a Trinidadian cricketer. He played in seven first-class matches for Trinidad and Tobago from 1940 to 1943.

See also
 List of Trinidadian representative cricketers

References

External links
 

1912 births
1987 deaths
Trinidad and Tobago cricketers
Trinidad and Tobago people of Indian descent